The King–Crane Commission, officially called the 1919 Inter-Allied Commission on Mandates in Turkey, was a commission of inquiry concerning the disposition of areas within the former Ottoman Empire.

The Commission began as an outgrowth of the 1919 Paris Peace Conference. The Commission visited areas of Palestine, Syria, Lebanon, and Anatolia, surveyed local public opinion, and assessed its view on the best course of action for the region. Originally meant to be led by French, British, Italian and American representatives, it ended as an investigation conducted solely by the United States government after the other countries withdrew to avoid the risk of being "confronted by recommendations from their own appointed delegates which might conflict with their policies". With the withdrawal of other allied nations, the commission lost any real credibility.

The Commission submitted its report to the Paris Peace Conference in August 1919. Its working being undercut from the beginning by France and the United Kingdom's pact, the Sykes-Picot Agreement, and colonialist designs, the Peace Conference had largely concluded the area's future by the time the report was finished.

Context 

At the Paris Peace Conference, groups of imperial nations such as France and Britain sought to divide the Ottoman Empire among themselves using the mandate system while anti-imperialist leaders such as President Wilson and Amir Faysal sought to oppose such plans. The conference began in 1919. In the wake of World War I, the participants were exhausted and particularly interested in the fate of their imperial rival, the Ottoman Empire.

The French in particular had extensive claims in the Middle East. Since as early 1900, the French began to build relationships and claims on political, moral and economic grounds. They created a role for themselves as the traditional protector of Lebanese Christians. The French supported the Maronites in Lebanon with missionaries and schools, deepening their relationship with the Christian religious community. Many Lebanese Christians feared domination as a religious minority and vocally supported the French Mandate. This gave the French political credibility in the region.

Finally French capitalists controlled 63% of the Ottoman Public Debt. This economic tie made France very concerned about the fate of the Ottoman Empire. The French were adamant that because of their unique relationship with Syria, they should be one of the nations to receive a mandate in Syria.

Secret negotiations 

The French allied themselves with the British in order to press their claims. While the British did not have the same connection with the Middle East, they were still interested in expanding and defending their existing colonial empire. In what came to be known as the Sykes Picot agreement, the French and the British agreed to divide the Middle East between the two of them after the war. When they reached the Paris Peace Conference, this agreement made negotiation on the Middle East nearly impossible. When American diplomats proposed the King–Crane Commission to investigate popular sentiment in Greater Syria, both French and British Diplomats greeted it with public approval, but behind the scenes the outcome had already been decided.

The British also engaged in secret negotiations with Arab powers in the Hussein-McMahon correspondence before the conference occurred. Ultimately, this would cause the British to fall into poor standing with the Arabs because they would betray Arabian trust by conducting simultaneous negotiations in the Sykes-Picot agreement and the Balfour Declaration. When the time came for a mandate to be selected, Arabs felt they could no longer trust Great Britain because of their support for Zionism.

Zionism and early Jewish settlement 

Zionism has been a popular and contentious subject among historians for many years. According to the author Nadim Rouhana, “the essence of the encounter therefore took place between a group of people living in their homeland and a group of people who arrived from other parts of the world guided by an ideology that claimed the same homeland as exclusively theirs.” Zionism in Rouhana's eye revolved around a system of exclusion in which Zionist arrived and stole the lands they resided on. This interpretation is understandable given the nature of the future state of Israel, but it does not give a full picture of Jewish people in Palestine. Author Dina Porat rounds off Rouhana's argument by stating, “Almost none of the Zionist leaders educated in Europe studied Arabic…Arabs did not master European languages or the Hebrew spoken by the settlers. The absence of a common language created an abyss that exists today.” The reason for the distance between the two groups rested in the lack of cultural assimilation. These two viewpoints demonstrate that the encounter between Zionists and Arab was one where cultural differences were ignored or exploited. The British in particular exploited the rivalry between these groups with the Balfour declaration. The Balfour Declaration aligned the goals of Zionism with their imperial goals.

The 1919 Paris Peace Conference 

The Commission was originally proposed by the United States as an international effort to determine if the region was ready for self-determination and to see what nations, if any, the locals wanted to act as mandatory powers. The plan received little support from the other nations, with many claimed delays. The Americans gradually realized that the British and French had already come to their own backroom deals about the future of the region, and new information could only muddy the waters. So, the United States alone sponsored the commission.

The Commission's representatives appointed by President Woodrow Wilson were Henry Churchill King, a theologian and fellow college president (of Oberlin College), and Charles R. Crane, a prominent Democratic Party contributor.
 
The Commission's effectiveness was hampered by the fact that it was the British army that actually protected them and controlled the translators, giving a skewed view of opinion where it was considerably easier to decry the French than the British. In spite of this, based on interviews with local elites, the Commission concluded that, while independence was preferred, the Americans were considered the second-best choice for a colonial power, the British the third-best, and the French easily the worst choice.

Based on these interviews, King concluded that while the Middle East was "not ready" for independence, a colonial government would not serve the people well either. He recommended instead that the Americans move in to occupy the region, because only the United States could be trusted to guide the people to self-sufficiency and independence rather than become an imperialist occupier. From King's personal writings, it seems that his overriding concern was the morally correct course of action, not necessarily tempered by politics or pragmatism. The Republicans had regained control of the United States Senate in the 1918 midterm elections.  In light of Republican isolationism, the probability of a huge military involvement and occupation overseas, even given British and French approval, was practically nil.

The British Foreign Office was willing to allow either the United States or Great Britain to administer the proposed Palestine mandate, but not the French or the Italian governments. The point ended up being moot in any case, as Lloyd George and Georges Clemenceau, heads of governments of Great Britain and France, prevailed in drafting the provisions of the San Remo conference and the Treaty of Sèvres. Lloyd George commented that "the friendship of France is worth ten Syrias." France received Syria while Britain would get Mesopotamia (Iraq) and Palestine, contrary to the expressed wishes of both the interviewees and the Commission itself. In the United States, the report floundered with Wilson's sickness and later death.

Delay in publication 
The Report was not intended to be published until the US Senate actually passed the Treaty of Versailles, which it never did. As a result, the report was only released to the public in 1922, after the Senate and House had passed a joint resolution favoring the establishment of a Jewish National Home in Palestine along the lines of the Balfour Declaration. Public opinion was divided when it was learned that the Arab majority had requested an American mandate with a democratically elected constituent assembly.

Conclusions regarding Syria, Palestine and Lebanon
The Commission's "Report upon Syria" covered the Arab territories of the defunct Ottoman Syria, then under the Occupied Enemy Territory Administration. This area covered would today encompass Syria, Lebanon, Israel, Palestine and Jordan, as well as Hatay and Cilicia.

The commission's visit to the region was 42 days long, from June 10 to July 21, 1919; 15 days were spent in OETA South, 10 in OETA West, 15 in OETA East, and 2 in OETA North. With respect to OETA North ("Cilicia"), the Commission "did not endeavor to give thorough hearings... feeling that it is not seriously to be considered a part of Syria, and desiring not to open up as yet the question of the Turkish-speaking portion of the former Turkish Empire." The population estimates included in the report are as follows:

The Commission Report, which was published in 1922, concluded that the Middle East was not ready for independence and urged Mandates be established on the territories whose purpose was to accompany a process of transition to self-determination.

The Commission hoped for a "Syria" built along liberal and nationalistic grounds that would become a modern democracy that protected the rights of its minorities. The Commission succeeded in convincing many of the educated, secular elite of this goal, but this didn't affect the negotiations at Versailles. Historian James Gelvin believes that the Commission actually weakened the stature of the pro-Western elites in Syria, as their vocal support of complete independence made no impact upon the result. The French Mandate of Syria was the result regardless, and the native elites were left either powerless or granted power only at the whim of the French. This helped set back the cause of an actual Syrian liberal democracy in Gelvin's view.

Although the commission was sympathetic toward Zionism, it opposed the establishment of a Jewish state in Palestine because it conflicted with the Balfour Declaration in respect of the civil and religious rights of non-Jewish communities in Palestine. The commission found that "Zionists looked forward to a practically complete dispossession of the present non-Jewish inhabitants of Palestine, by various forms of purchase". Nearly 90% of the Palestinian population was emphatically against the entire Zionist program.

The report noted that there is a principle that the wishes of the local population must be taken into account and that there is widespread anti-Zionist feeling in Palestine and Syria, and the holy nature of the land to Christians and Moslems as well as Jews must preclude solely Jewish dominion. It also noted that Jews at that time comprised only 10% of the population of Palestine.

The Commission Report was skeptical of the viability of a Jewish state in "Syria". The logic of the Commission went along the lines that the first principle to be respected must be self-determination. It pointed out that a majority of "Syrians" were against the formation of a Jewish state. It concluded that the only way to establish a viable Jewish state would be with armed force to enforce it. This was precisely what the Commission wanted to avoid, so they dismissed the idea, saying that Zionists anticipated "a practically complete dispossession of the present non-Jewish inhabitants to Palestine, by various forms of purchase". That said, there would be nothing wrong with Jews coming to "Israel" and simply living as Jewish Syrian citizens, but noted "nor can the erection of such a Jewish State be accomplished without the gravest trespass upon the civil and religious rights of existing non-Jewish communities in Palestine". The latter statement was based on the assumption that an army of at least 50,000 would be required to establish Jewish ownership by force. In respect to the creation of a Jewish state in the Middle East, the report cautioned "Not only you as president but the American people as a whole should realise that if the American government decided to support the establishment of a Jewish state in Palestine, they are committing the American people to the use of force in that area, since only by force can a Jewish state in Palestine be established or maintained."

About the international importance of Palestine, the report noted:

"The fact that the Arabic-speaking portion of the Turkish Empire has been the birthplace of the three great religions: Judaism, Christianity, and Islam, and that Palestine contains places sacred to all three, makes inevitably a center of interest and concern for the whole civilised world. No solution which is merely local or has only a single people in mind can avail."

While the holy places "having to do with Jesus–and also sacred to Moslems, are not only not sacred to Jews, but abhorrent to them", Moslems and Christians would not feel satisfied to have these places in Jewish hands, or under the custody of Jews. "With the best possible intentions, it may be doubted whether the Jews could possibly seem to either Christians or Moslems proper guardians of the holy places, or custodians of the Holy Land as a whole." The Commission recommended to include Palestine in a united Syrian State, the holy places being cared for by an International and Inter-religious Commission, in which also the Jews would have representation. All Syria should become under a single Mandate, led by a Power desired by the people, with America as first choice.

Results of the petitions received
The King-Crane commission created "the first-ever survey of Arab public opinion," but its results went largely unheeded. The table below shows results of the petitions received from OETA South (became Palestine), OETA West (became Lebanon and Western Syria) and OETA East (became Syria and Transjordan).

Conclusions regarding Armenia

The Commission expressed support for the creation of an Armenian state and rejected that Turkey would respect the rights of the Armenian population, in the light of the genocide suffered by the Armenians during the war.

The Report
Its publication was initially suppressed for various reasons, and later reported by the State Department that publication "would not be compatible with the public interest". The Commission's report was ultimately published in the December 2, 1922 edition of the Editor & Publisher magazine.

Report of the American Section of the International Commission on Mandates in Turkey, Paris, August 28, 1919, Papers Relating to the Foreign Relations of the United States, The Paris Peace Conference, 1919, Volume XII, Field Missions of the American Commission to Negotiate Peace, Document 380, Paris Peace Conf. 181.9102/9 (Office of the Historian)
 King Crane Commission, “King-Crane report on the Near East,” Editor and Publisher 55 no. 27 (winter 1922)

 World War I Document Archive
 IPCRI
 HRI
 King-Crane Commission Digital Collection, Oberlin College Archives

Notes

Further reading 
 
 
Smith, L.V., 'Wilsonian Sovereignty in the Middle East: The King–Crane Commission Report of 1919', in D. Howland and L. White, The State of Sovereignty, Bloomington: Indiana University Press, 2009. 
The Israel-Arab Reader: A Documentary History of the Middle East Conflict, edited by Walter Laqueur, 31-33. New York: B. L. Mazel, 1969.
Friedman, Isaiah. The Question of Palestine, 1914-1918: British-Jewish-Arab Relations. New York: Schocken Books, 1973.
Hourani, Albert. Syria and Lebanon: A Political Essay. London: Oxford University Press, 1946.
Ingrams, Doreen. Palestine Papers 1917-1922 Seeds of Conflict. New York: Braziller, George, 1972.
Khoury, Philip. Syrian and the French Mandate: The Politics of Arab Nationalism. Princeton: Princeton University Press, 1987.
Longrigg, Stephen Hemsley. Syria and Lebanon Under French Mandate. London: Oxford University Press, 1958.
Petran, Tabitha. Syria. New York: Praeger Publishers, 1972.
Tibawi, Abdul. A Modern History of Syria: Including Lebanon and Palestine. London: Macmillan and Co, 1969.
 

Aftermath of World War I in the United States
1919 in Mandatory Syria
1919 in the United States
1919 in international relations
Documents of Mandatory Palestine
Aftermath of World War I in Turkey